The 37th Infantry Division was a unit of the United States Army in World War I and World War II. It was a National Guard division from Ohio, nicknamed the "Buckeye Division". Today, its lineage is continued through the 37th Infantry Brigade Combat Team, with battalions from Ohio, Michigan, and South Carolina.

World War I

It was initially activated as the 16th Division, a National Guard formation from Ohio and West Virginia in 1913. It was federally activated in August 1917 as a National Guard Division from Ohio. It was sent overseas in June 1918 and fought at the Meuse-Argonne and at Ypres-Lys offensives

Order of battle
 Headquarters, 37th Division
 73rd Infantry Brigade
145th Infantry Regiment
146th Infantry Regiment
135th Machine Gun Battalion
74th Infantry Brigade
147th Infantry Regiment
148th Infantry Regiment
136th Machine Gun Battalion
62nd Field Artillery Brigade
134th Field Artillery Regiment (75 mm)
135th Field Artillery Regiment (75 mm)
136th Field Artillery Regiment (155 mm)
112th Trench Mortar Battery
134th Machine Gun Battalion
112th Engineer Regiment
112th Field Signal Battalion
Headquarters Troop, 37th Division
112th Train Headquarters and Military Police
112th Ammunition Train
112th Supply Train
112th Engineer Train
112th Sanitary Train
145th, 146th, 147th, and 148th Ambulance Companies and Field Hospitals

Casualties
 Total: 5,387
 KIA: 794
 WIA: 4,593

Commanders
Brigadier General William R. Smith (26 August 1917)
Major General Charles G. Treat (3 September 1917)
Brigadier General William R. Smith (18 September 1917)
Brigadier General Joseph A. Gaston (25 April 1918)
Major General Charles S. Farnsworth (8 May 1918)
Brigadier General William M. Fassett (5 December 1918)
Major General Charles S. Farnsworth (10 December 1918)
Brigadier General Steven W. Stepien (14 December 1918)

World War II
Ordered into federal service: 15 October 1940 (National Guard Division from Ohio)
Overseas: 26 May 1942
Campaigns: Northern Solomons, Battle of Luzon
Distinguished Unit Citations: 9
Awards:
 Medals of Honor: 7
 Distinguished Service Crosses: 116
 Distinguished Service Medals: 4
 Silver Stars: 1,008
 Legions of Merit: 71
 Soldier's Medals: 101
 Bronze Stars: 6,807
 Air Medals: 84
Commanders: Maj. Gen. Robert S. Beightler commanded the Division during its entire period of Federal service in World War II.
Returned to U.S.: November 1945
Inactivated: 18 December 1945 at Camp Anza, California.

Order of battle
Headquarters, 37th Infantry Division
129th Infantry Regiment
145th Infantry Regiment
148th Infantry Regiment
Headquarters and Headquarters Battery, 37th Infantry Division Artillery
6th Field Artillery Battalion
135th Field Artillery Battalion
136th Field Artillery Battalion
140th Field Artillery Battalion
117th Engineer Combat Battalion
112th Medical Battalion
37th Cavalry Reconnaissance Troop (Mechanized)
Headquarters, Special Troops, 37th Infantry Division
Headquarters Company, 37th Infantry Division
737th Ordnance Light Maintenance Company
37th Quartermaster Company
37th Signal Company
Military Police Platoon
Band
 37th Counterintelligence Corps Detachment

Combat chronicle

The 37th Infantry Division arrived in Fiji in June 1942 to fortify the islands against possible invasion. The division continued its training on the islands. With the end of ground fighting on Guadalcanal, the division moved to that island in April 1943, continued training, and staged for the Munda campaign. Two battalions joined the Marine Raiders on New Georgia, 5 July 1943, while the remainder of the division landed, 22 July, and assisted the 43d Infantry Division in taking Munda airfield in heavy fighting. After mopping up on New Georgia, the division returned to Guadalcanal, 9 September 1943, for rest and rehabilitation.

The division's next assignment was Bougainville as part of the I Marine Amphibious Corps. Landing between 8 and 19 November 1943, the 37th Division expanded the western beachhead sector, constructed roads and bridges, and engaged in extensive patrol activity. On 15 December 1943, IMAC was relieved by the XIV Corps, to which the 37th Division was then assigned. In March 1944, two Japanese divisions made eight major attacks, but division lines held. In April patrols cleared the Laruma Valley area of major enemy units. The division remained on Bougainville and trained for the Luzon campaign. Landing with the Sixth Army on the beaches of Lingayen Gulf, 9 January 1945, the 37th raced inland against slight resistance to Clark Field and Fort Stotsenburg where fierce resistance delayed capture of those objectives until 31 January. The division continued to drive to Manila against small delaying forces, and entered the city's outskirts, 4 February. Upon crossing the Pasig River, it ran into bitter Japanese opposition. By heavy street fighting, American and Filipino troops cleared the city by 3 March 1945.

After garrison duty in Manila, 5–26 March, the division shifted to the hills of Northwest Luzon, where heavy fighting culminated in the capture of Baguio, 26 April with aided Filipino troops under the 66th Infantry Regiment, Philippine Commonwealth Army, USAFIP-NL. Rest and rehabilitation during May were followed by action in June in the Cagayan Valley against deteriorating Japanese resistance. With the end of hostilities, 15 August, the division was concerned with the collection and processing of prisoners of war, leaving November 1945 for the States and demobilization.

Major General Robert Beightler was one of only eleven generals who commanded their divisions for the entire war, and was the only National Guard general to do so.

Casualties
Total battle casualties: 5,960
Killed in action: 1,094
Wounded in action: 4,861
Missing in action: 4
Prisoner of war: 1
Days of combat: 592

After 1945
The division was reorganized in the Ohio Army National Guard in 1946. It served under federal control from 1952 to 1954 at Camp Polk, Louisiana. Although the division was not sent to Korea, nearly every soldier was as an individual replacement. The 37th went through a number of reorganizations from 1959 until it was disbanded on 15 February 1968.

The bulk of the division's combat units became the 73rd Infantry Brigade, 38th Infantry Division with the remaining becoming the 16th Engineer Brigade and other combat support units. In 1977, the 73rd Brigade was released from assignment to the 38th ID and was redesignated the 73rd Infantry Brigade, a separate brigade. During the draw down of forces after the Cold War, units of the 73rd and the 107th Armored Cavalry Regiment consolidated to form the 37th Brigade, 28th Infantry Division. A year later, the brigade was reunited with the 38th Infantry Division.

On 1 September 2007, 37th Infantry Brigade Combat Team (IBCT) was activated under the Army's modular plan. The shoulder sleeve insignia of the 37th IBCT is heavily based on that of the 37th Infantry Division and many units that are part of the 37th IBCT, served in the 37th Infantry Division.

See also
Rodger Wilton Young
John N. Reese, Jr.
Cleto Rodríguez
George Sweigert, inventor of the cordless phone, veteran of the 37th Division, participated in action at Guadalcanal and the Solomon Islands. Sweigert was assigned to the 145th Headquarters Company as a radioman and intelligence scout.

References

Notes

Sources
CMH The Army Almanac: A Book of Facts Concerning the Army of the United States - U.S. Government Printing Office, 1950

External links

World War I action and 37th Division

Divisions of the United States Army National Guard
037th Infantry Division, U.S.
Military units and formations established in 1917
Infantry Division, U.S. 037
United States Army divisions of World War I
Infantry divisions of the United States Army in World War II
Military units and formations disestablished in 1968